Crooks in Tails is a 1937 German film directed by Johannes Riemann and starring Camilla Horn, Paul Klinger and Karl Martell.

It was shot on location on the French Riviera.

Cast

References

Bibliography

External links 
 

1937 films
Films of Nazi Germany
1930s German-language films
Films directed by Johannes Riemann
Films set in France
Films shot in France
Films set in Monaco
Tobis Film films
German black-and-white films
1930s German films